Firmin Martin Schmidt (October 12, 1918 - August 4, 2005) was a Roman Catholic bishop.

Born in Catharine, Kansas, United States, Schmidt was ordained a priest for the Capuchin order on June 2, 1946. On April 3, 1959, he was appointed prefect of Mendi, Papua New Guinea, and then vicar apostolic of Mendi and titular bishop of Conana on June 6, 1965; he was ordained bishop on December 15, 1965. On November 15, 1966, he was appointed first bishop of the Roman Catholic Diocese of Mendi retiring on February 3, 1995.

Notes

1918 births
2005 deaths
People from Ellis County, Kansas
Capuchins
American Roman Catholic priests
20th-century Roman Catholic bishops in Papua New Guinea
Catholics from Kansas
Roman Catholic bishops of Mendi
Roman Catholic titular bishops